The 2015 Rochdale Metropolitan Borough Council election took place on 7 May 2015 to elect one third of the members of Rochdale Metropolitan Borough Council in England. This took place on the same day as the 2015 General Election and other local elections.

The Labour Party retained control of the council.

After the election, the composition of the council was:
Labour 47
Conservative 10
Liberal Democrat 2
Independent (Rochdale First)1

Election result

Ward results
The electoral division results listed below are based on the changes from the 2014 elections, not taking into account any mid-term by-elections or party defections.

Balderstone & Kirkholt ward

Bamford ward

Castleton ward

Central Rochdale ward

East Middleton ward

Healey ward

Hopwood Hall ward

Kingsway ward

Littleborough Lakeside ward

Milkstone & Deeplish ward

Milnrow & Newhey ward

Norden ward

North Heywood ward

North Middleton ward

Smallbridge & Firgrove ward

South Middleton ward

Spotland & Falinge ward

Wardle & West Littleborough ward

West Heywood ward

West Middleton ward

References

2015 English local elections
May 2015 events in the United Kingdom
2015
2010s in Greater Manchester